Berriasellinae is a subfamily of very late Jurassic and very early Cretaceous perisphinctoid ammonites in the family Neocomitidae.  Berriasellinae comprises generally compressed, evolute genera, typically with furcated ribbing, and in some a smooth ventral band or groove.  Berriasellinae are derived from the Ataxioceratidae and gave rise to the other Neocomitidae.  The short lived Himalayitidae from the uppermost Jurassic have a similar appearance but differ in being generally broader and having sharper ribbing.

In current classifications (e.g. Donovan et al. 1981) berriasellid perisphinctaceans are included in the Neocomitidae as a subfamily, the Berriasellinae.  In older classification such as the Treatise on Invertebrate Paleontology, part L (1957), neocomitid genera are included in the Berriasellidae, sensu lato, as the Neocomitinae.

Berriasellinae includes the genera  Andiceras, Berriasella, Blanfordiceras, Delphinella, Elenaella, Jabronella, Parandiceras, Raimondiceras, Subalpinites, Substeueroceras, and Tirnovella.

References
Arkell, et al., 1957 Mesozoic Ammonoidea. Treatise on Invertebrate Paleontology, Part L. Geological Society of Americia and University of Kansas press.
Donovan, Callomon and Howarth 1981. Classification of the Jurassic Ammonitina; Systematics Association. 
Paleobiology Database Berriasellinae entry accessed 11/26/10

Perisphinctoidea
Tithonian first appearances
Early Cretaceous extinctions